The 1979 Columbia Lions football team was an American football team that represented Columbia University during the 1979 NCAA Division I-A football season. Columbia finished second-to-last in the Ivy League. 

In their sixth and final season under head coach William Campbell, the Lions compiled a 1–8 record and were outscored 215 to 68. Brian O’Hagan and Geoff Stoner were the team captains.  

The Lions' 1–6 conference record placed seventh in the Ivy League standings. Columbia was outscored 177 to 47 by Ivy opponents. 

Columbia played its home games at Baker Field in Upper Manhattan, in New York City.

Schedule

References

Columbia
Columbia Lions football seasons
Columbia Lions football